The Aje clan , also Are clan, was a ruling dynasty in the Yenisei Kyrgyz Khaganate. The Kyrgyz Khagans considered Li Ling to be the ancestor of their dynasty.

Etymology 
The Kyrgyz ruler was called «Aje» (Ajo). Modern transcription is the form «Aje». Judging by Tang sources, Aje is both the title and the clan name of the ruling house of the Kyrgyz in the 8th-9th centuries. As Vasily Bartold writes, the title is mentioned only in Tang sources. In the modern Kyrgyz language, there is the word «Aжоо», which means «Leader».

History 
Bars Bek was the first member of the dynasty to take the title of Khagan. He ruled from 693 to 711.

The dynasty had family ties with other Turkic families with the Turgesh, Karluks, Tibetans, Ashina Turks and princesses of Tang dynasty. This is evidenced by the marriage of Bars Bek to the daughter of Ilterish Qaghan, to the younger sister of Kul Tigin and Bilge Qaghan.

Emperor Wuzon wrote to the Khagan of the Yenisei Kyrgyz:

It is known from the history of the Tang dynasty that the rulers of the Kyrgyz were descendants of the Han commander Li Ling. According to Hyacinth, «Li Ling remained with the Xiongnu and received Khyagas (a transcription of the word Kyrgyz used during the Tang dynasty) in possession, where his descendants reigned almost until the time of Genghis Khan». According to another interpretation, the descendants of Li Ling come from the Mongolian steppes, associated with the Xiongnu.

Members 
Li Ling - Founder. (99 BC-74 BC) 
Shiboqu Azhan - Elteber of the Yenisei Kyrgyz state. (632-693)
Bars Bek - Khagan of the Yenisei Kyrgyz Khaganate. (693-711)
Bilge Tong Erkin - Khagan of the Yenisei Kyrgyz Khaganate.  (758-795)
Ajo Qaghan - Khagan of the Yenisei Kyrgyz Khaganate. (795-847)
Alp Sol Tepek -  Tarkhan of the Yenisei Kyrgyz Khaganate. (9th century)
Yingwu Qaghan - Khagan of the Yenisei Kyrgyz Khaganate. (847-866)
Beigu Inal - Inal of the Yenisei Kyrgyz Khaganate. (10th century)
Kurlun Inal - Inal of the Yenisei Kyrgyz Khaganate. (12 century)
Urus Inal -Inal of the Yenisei Kyrgyz Khaganate. (12 century)
Edi Inal - Inal of the Yenisei Kyrgyz Khaganate. (12th century)

See also
 Are (surname)

References

Turkic dynasties
1st millennium in China
History of Kyrgyzstan
Clans
Surnames